Piotr Parasiewicz is an Austrian-American river professor, Director of Rushing Rivers Institute, and the creator of the Mesohabitat Simulation Model (MesoHABSIM). He holds a Ph.D in Natural resource management and Water Engineering. He has been working to restore rivers to their natural state and conserve water for human use, including the Quinebaug River, Fort River, Saugatuck River & Aspetuck River, Eightmile River (Connecticut River), and Delaware River.

Education 
Parasiewicz began his studies in 1985 at the University of Agricultural Sciences in Vienna, Austria, receiving his B.S. degree in Environmental and Water Engineering. He continued his education at the University of Agricultural Sciences and in 1993 he received his M.S. degree in Environmental and Water Engineering. In 1998 he received his Ph.D in Natural Resources Management and Water Engineering. He gained additional training in 1994 at the Utah State University in Logan, in using the computer-based Physical Habitat Simulation (PHABSIM) and Instream Flow Incremental Methodology (IFIM),and later Stream Habitat Sampling Techniques at Colorado State University, in Fort Collins.

Career 

Between 1984 and 1999 he resided in Vienna, Austria, with his wife, Maria Parasiewicz, and their two children while working at the University of Agricultural Sciences as a research assistant and university lecturer in the Department of Hydrobiology, Fisheries and Aquaculture. The following year he moved with his family to the United States and worked as a post-doctoral fellow at the New York Cooperative Fish and Wildlife Research Unit at Cornell University. Between 2000 and 2004 he was the director of the Instream Habitat Program at Cornell University and a research associate in the Department of Natural Resources. Between 2003 and 2004 he transitioned to the University of Massachusetts in Amherst, working for the Department of Natural Resources Conservation as a research associate professor from 2004 to 2007. During this time he was also an adjunct assistant professor in the Department of Natural Resources Management and Engineering at the University of Connecticut in Storrs, Connecticut.

In 2007, Parasiewicz inaugurated the Rushing Rivers Institute, a river science non-profit organization dedicated to the preservation of water resources for environmental and human use, of which he is the director. He is also an adjunct professor at the University of Nebraska-Lincoln. He is best known as a developer of the Mesohabitat Simulation Model, which provides computer simulation models of instream habitat for fish and mussels.

In 2011, Parasiewicz returned to Poland and in 2012 he completed habilitation at the S. Sakowicz Inland Fisheries Institute in Poland and took there an associate professor position and Head of River Fisheries Department. He served on technical committee of European Inland Fisheries and Aquaculture Advisory Commission of FAO and recently on the Polish National Water Management Advisory Board. He was a workpackage co-leader in EU Funded Adaptive Management of Barriers on European Rivers (AMBER) project.

Publications and contributions 
His publications include:
Parasiewicz, P., J. Nestler, N.L. Poff and A. Goodwin. (2008) Virtual Reference River: A Model for Scientific Discovery and Reconciliation. 2008. In: M. S. Alonso, I. M. Rubio (ed) Ecological Management: New Research, Nova Science Publishers, Inc. pp.-
Parasiewicz, P. (2007): Developing a reference habitat template and ecological management scenarios using the MesoHABSIM model. River Research and Application 23 (8): 924-932.
Parasiewicz P. (2003): Upscaling: Integrating habitat model into rivermanagement. Canadian Water Resources Journal. Special Issue: State-of-the-Art in Habitat Modeling and Conservation of Flows 28 (2) p. 283-300.
Parasiewicz P. (2001): MesoHABSIM - a concept for application of instream flow models in river restoration planning. Fisheries 29 (9) p. 6-13.
Parasiewicz P. & M. J. Dunbar (2001): Physical habitat modelling for fish – a developing approach - Archiv für Hydrobiologie. Suppl. (Large Rivers Vol.12), 135/2-4 p. 239-268.
Parasiewicz P., Hofmann H. C. & B. Höglinger (1999): The DVP - Depth Velocity Position Bar - a multiplex instrument for physical habitat measurements in small riverine domains - Regulated Rivers: Research and Management, 15, 77-86.
Parasiewicz, P., S. Schmutz & O. Moog, (1998): The effects of managed hydropower peaking on the physical habitat, benthos and fish fauna in the Bregenzerach, a nival 6th order river in Austria, Fisheries Management and Ecology, 1998, 5, 403-417.
Parasiewicz, P. (1996): Estimation of physical habitat characteristics using automation and geodesic-based sampling. Regulated Rivers: Research & Management, Vol. 12, 575-583.

References

External links 
 Official Rushing Rivers Institute Website
 Official MesoHABSIM Website
 Maria Parasiewicz Website

Living people
Utah State University alumni
Year of birth missing (living people)
Hydrologists